Monroe, known as "the Cheese Capital of the USA", is a city in and the county seat of Green County, Wisconsin, United States. The population was 10,661 at the 2020 census. The city is bordered by the Town of Monroe to the north and the Town of Clarno to the south. Monroe is a part of the Madison Metropolitan Statistical Area

Geography

Demographics

As of 2000 the median income for a household in the city was $36,922, and the median income for a family was $47,361. Males had a median income of $32,050 versus $22,112 for females. The per capita income for the city was $21,657. About 2.4% of families and 5.4% of the population were below the poverty line, including 4.3% of those under age 18 and 8.1% of those age 65 or over.

2020 census
As of the census of 2020, the population was 10,661. The racial makeup of the city was 89.2% White, 0.7% Black or African American, 0.7% Asian, 0.4% Native American, 4.1% from other races, and 4.9% from two or more races. Ethnically, the population was 7.6% Hispanic or Latino of any race.

According  to the American Community Survey estimates for 2016-2020, the median income for a household in the city was $51,996, and the median income for a family was $69,493. Male full-time workers had a median income of $48,772 versus $36,334 for female workers. The per capita income for the city was $31,308. About 8.0% of families and 10.7% of the population were below the poverty line, including 9.9% of those under age 18 and 15.9% of those age 65 or over. Of the population age 25 and over, 90.6% were high school graduates or higher and 17.4% had a bachelor's degree or higher.

2010 census
As of the census of 2010, there were 10,827 people, 4,810 households, and 2,781 families residing in the city. The racial makeup of the city was 94.8% White, 0.6% African American, 0.2% Native American, 0.7% Asian, 2.6% from other races, and 1.1% from two or more races. Hispanic or Latino of any race were 4.9% of the population.

There were 4,810 households, of which 27.4% had children under the age of 18 living with them, 42.8% were married couples living together, 10.7% had a female householder with no husband present, 4.3% had a male householder with no wife present, and 42.2% were non-families. 36.4% of all households were made up of individuals, and 16.9% had someone living alone who was 65 years of age or older. The average household size was 2.22 and the average family size was 2.87.

The median age in the city was 41.1 years. 22.5% of residents were under the age of 18; 8% were between the ages of 18 and 24; 24% were from 25 to 44; 26.8% were from 45 to 64; and 18.8% were 65 years of age or older. The gender makeup of the city was 47.9% male and 52.1% female.

Education
The School District of Monroe is the largest school district in Green County, serving around 2,700 pupils, and having an open enrollment procedure. The school district maintains Monroe High School, home of the Cheesemakers in the Badger Conference, Monroe Middle School, Abraham Lincoln Accelerated Learning Academy, Parkside Elementary School, and Northside Elementary School. The district also has an alternative high school and middle school, as well as a virtual school. St. Victor Catholic elementary school offers grades K (four years old) through 5. Monroe has a campus of Blackhawk Technical College, the community's sole institution of post-secondary education.

Transportation

Wisconsin State Highways
  WIS 11 runs around Monroe on the bypass.
  WIS 59 ends in the northeast corner of the city near the Monroe Clinic.
  WIS 69 runs on the bypass for 1 mile with WIS 81 and WIS 11.
  WIS 81 runs around Monroe on the bypass.

Airport
Monroe Municipal Airport (KEFT) serves the city and surrounding communities.

Recreational trails
 Badger State Trail Runs from Madison through Fitchburg past the Ice Age National Scenic Trail Montrose segment, Belleville, New Glarus, and crosses the Sugar River State Trail before reaching Monroe, and  then continues to meet with the Jane Addams Trail at the Illinois border which continues to Freeport, Illinois.
 Cheese Country Trail

Railroads
Wisconsin and Southern Railroad serves the city with freight service. A branch line from Janesville ends at Badger State Ethanol.

Recreation
Monroe's parks include Twining Park, where the city's Swiss bandshell is located; Recreation Park, home to the city swimming pool; and Honey Creek Park, the site of a skate park. Bunting/Jones Park is a small park with just one picnic table and a handgun range. The city is the eastern starting point for the Cheese Country Trail, a 47-mile multi-purpose recreational path, and the Badger State Trail, a bicycle and pedestrian-only trail in summer and an ATV/snowmobile trail in winter. The "Cheese Trail" extends from Mineral Point to Monroe, while the Badger State Trail runs from the state line to Madison and connects to the Jane Addams Trail in Illinois. Both are former railway corridors. Monroe is also home to Stateline Ice and Community Expo (S.L.I.C.E.), the only indoor ice-rink in Green County.

Cheese Days

Cheese Days is a biennial celebration of cheese and the dairy industry, taking place in Monroe, Wisconsin.  Established in 1914, the weekend long event typically occurs on the third weekend in September of even-numbered years in the historic downtown area known as “the Square”.  The festivities include carnival rides, a variety of local food, restaurant, craft, and club stands, live, traditional Swiss-Germanic music (including polkas and waltzes), and a culmination of it all into a two-hour parade on the Sunday afternoon.  Over one hundred thousand people come for the festivities throughout the three-day event.

Cheese Days were not held in 1918, 1942, 1944 and 2020.

Notable people

 Henry Adams, Wisconsin State Representative and Senator
 Bob Anderegg, professional basketball player
 Ken Behring, former owner of the Seattle Seahawks
 James Bintliff, Union Army general
 John Bolender, Wisconsin State Representative
 Ira B. Bradford, Wisconsin State Representative
 Evelene Brodstone, one of the highest paid female executives of the 1920s
 Dick Campbell, singer, songwriter, movie director
 Edwin Copeland, botanist and founder of the University of the Philippines Los Banos College of Agriculture
 David G. Deininger, jurist and legislator
 A. Clarke Dodge, Wisconsin State Representative and businessman
 Joe Dodge, jazz musician
 G. Fred Galli, cheesemaker and legislator
 John C. Hall, Wisconsin State Senator and physician
 Loyd Ivey, Owner/CEO of Mitek (MTX Audio, Atlas Sound)
 Andre Jacque, Wisconsin State Representative
 Janet Jennings, nurse during the Spanish–American War
 Harry A. Keegan, Wisconsin State Representative
 Nathan J. Lindsay, U.S. Air Force major general
 William H. H. Llewellyn, New Mexico State Representative, member of the Rough Riders
 Joe Lobdell, professional football player
 John Luchsinger, legislator, writer, jurist
 Willis Ludlow, Wisconsin State Representative and mayor of Monroe
 Ric Mathias, NFL player
 Perry A.C. Reed, Nebraska State Senator
 William Rittenhouse, Wisconsin State Senator
 Ray H. Schoonover, Wisconsin State Representative, sheriff, and businessman
 Tom Tennant, MLB player
 Robin G. Tornow, U.S. Air Force general
 Charles Treat, U.S. Army general, Army Distinguished Service Medal recipient
 Joseph B. Treat, Wisconsin State Senator and Chairman of the Republican State Central Committee
 Nathaniel Treat, Maine State Representative
 Nathaniel B. Treat, Wisconsin State Representative
 Nathan Farragut Twining, Chief of Staff, United States Air Force
 Merrill B. Twining, United States Marine Corps general 
 Don S. Wenger, U.S. Air Force major general
 Walter S. Wescott, Wisconsin State Representative and Senator
 Francis H. West, Union Army general
 George Otto Wirz, Roman Catholic bishop
 Edwin E. Woodman, Wisconsin State Senator
 Art Young, cartoonist and writer

References

External links
 

 City of Monroe

Cities in Wisconsin
Cities in Green County, Wisconsin
Micropolitan areas of Wisconsin
County seats in Wisconsin
Swiss-American culture in Wisconsin